Massimiliano Fedriga (born 2 July 1980 in Verona) is an Italian Northern League politician.
He is the president of the Friuli-Venezia Giulia autonomous region.

Biography
Born in Verona on 2 July 1980 and raised in Trieste, Fedriga graduated in Communication Sciences at the University of Trieste. After graduating, he obtained a master's degree in communication management and analysis.

He joined the Northern League in 1995. Subsequently, he became a member of the "National Council", the decision-making body of the party in Friuli-Venezia Giulia and then of the Federal Council. Since 2003 he has been provincial secretary of the League, while on 28 September 2014 he was elected national secretary of the party of Friuli Venezia Giulia.

He was elected MP for the first time in 2008; he was then re-elected in 2013 and 2018.

In 2011 Fedriga was candidate for mayor of Trieste, but obtained only 6.3% of the votes.

In 2018 Fedriga was elected President of Friuli Venezia Giulia with 57.1% of preferences.

He is Knight of Honor of the Order of St. George.

References

1980 births
Living people
Politicians from Trieste
University of Trieste alumni
Lega Nord politicians
Deputies of Legislature XVI of Italy
Deputies of Legislature XVII of Italy
Deputies of Legislature XVIII of Italy
Presidents of Friuli-Venezia Giulia
21st-century Italian politicians